Lovett is an unincorporated community in Lovett Township, Jennings County, Indiana.

History
Lovett was platted in 1855. A post office was established at Lovett in 1870, and remained in operation until it was discontinued in 1934.

Geography

References

Unincorporated communities in Jennings County, Indiana
Unincorporated communities in Indiana